The Iran Mercantile Exchange (IME) is a commodities exchange located in Tehran, Iran.

Established on 20 September 2007 from the merger of the Tehran Metal Exchange and the Iran Agricultural Exchange, IME trades in agricultural, metal and mineral, oil and petrochemical products in the spot market and gold coin in the futures market. The Exchange handles over 26 million tonnes of commodities on an annual basis worth in excess of US$14 billion. IME caters to both the domestic and regional markets, bringing together a host of trade participants and market makers from the capital market community, trade and industrial sectors, hedgers, retail and institutional investors.

Commodities 
IME facilitates the trading of commodities and products through its markets.

IME's Listed Commodities on Different Trading Floors

Products

Industrial

Steel
Aluminum
Copper
Gold Bar
Zinc
Lead
Precious Metals
Nickel
Industrial & Mineral (including cement)

Petrochemicals & Oil by-products

Bitumen
Chemical
Polymers
Sulfur
Base Oil
Lube Cut

Agricultural

Grains Group: various kinds of corn, grain, wheat, rice, bran
Dried and Trans Products: various kinds of pistachio, date, raisins, saffron, cumin, tea, sugar
Oil Meals and Seeds Group: various kinds of oily seeds like soybean and oil cake seeds like soybean, colza, cotton seed, sunshade, Safflower cake, corn, palm
Cereals Group:  pea, lentil
Frozen Chicken

New products

In 2016, IME  introduced gold futures and options (as hedging tools).

Supervision and regulation
The Securities and Exchange Organization (SEO) is the sole regulatory entity for the regulation and development of the capital market in Iran. In 2013 Iran Mercantile Exchange joined the Federation of Euro-Asian Stock Exchanges (FEAS) as a full member. It is also a member of Association of Futures Markets (AFM).

Tradable contracts
Spot contract
Forward contract
Contract on Credit
Futures contract (since 2008)
Options contract

Trading system
Trading in IME is based on open outcry auction using electronic trading platform, an interaction of bids and offers made by the buying and selling brokers. Orders, already placed by the clients, are entered in the system by the brokers sitting behind their stations in the trading floor. The system processes the orders and executes the transaction upon matching of the bid and offer prices.

IME Statistics

1 Due to the reclassification of "cement" under "manufacturing and mining products", figures for 2010/11 have been revised. Previously, "cement" was classified under "oil and petrochemical products".

References

External links
 Iran Mercantile Exchange

Commodity exchanges in Iran